Seppo Rantanen (born 2 September 1963) is a Finnish cross-country skier. He competed in the men's 30 kilometre classical event at the 1992 Winter Olympics.

Cross-country skiing results
All results are sourced from the International Ski Federation (FIS).

Olympic Games

World Championships

World Cup

Season standings

References

External links
 

1963 births
Living people
Finnish male cross-country skiers
Olympic cross-country skiers of Finland
Cross-country skiers at the 1992 Winter Olympics
People from Lappeenranta
Sportspeople from South Karelia
20th-century Finnish people